The Hahnheide is a wooded moraine landscape in the east of the municipality Trittau (Stormarn County) in Schleswig-Holstein, in Germany.

The name Hahnheide means derived in today's language  High Heath.

In the Middle Ages the Hahnheide was still associated with the Sachsenwald. Due to the economic use until 1821 the forest stock shrank more and more. In the middle of the 19th century, reforestation started, so that 95 % of the area is wooded today. The area was protected in 1938.

The second highest elevation in the 1,450 ha area is the Great Hahnheide Mountain (99 m above sea level). There, in 1974, after the former mayor Otto Hergenhan "Langer Otto" called, wooden observation tower was built and rebuilt in 2001 with a height of 27 m. The highest elevation, however, is the Little Hahnheide Mountain, curiously enough with 100 m above sea level, a little higher than its directly opposite counterpart.

The 18th century road through the Hahnheide from Trittau to Hohenfelde consists of a cobblestone paved section on one side and an unpaved so-called summer path on the other side. It is now a listed building.

A 26-hectare area of the Hahnheide has been designated as a natural forest cell since 1982.

Bibliography

References

External links
 A hike through the Hahnheide (German)
 Brochure of the state government of Schleswig-Holstein (German)

Forests and woodlands of Schleswig-Holstein
Nature reserves in Schleswig-Holstein